Polk Township is a township in Jefferson County, Pennsylvania, United States. The population was 282 at the 2020 census. It was named for President James K. Polk.

Geography
The township is in northern Jefferson County and is bordered to the northeast by Elk County. It includes the unincorporated communities of Green Briar, Schoffner Corner, Blowtown, Munderf, and Dixon Corner.

Demographics

As of the census of 2000, there were 294 people, 111 households, and 80 families residing in the township.  The population density was 9.6 people per square mile (3.7/km2).  There were 389 housing units at an average density of 12.7/sq mi (4.9/km2).  The racial makeup of the township was 95.24% White, 1.70% African American, 0.34% Native American, 0.68% Asian, and 2.04% from two or more races. Hispanic or Latino of any race were 3.06% of the population.

There were 111 households, out of which 27.0% had children under the age of 18 living with them, 60.4% were married couples living together, 6.3% had a female householder with no husband present, and 27.9% were non-families. 24.3% of all households were made up of individuals, and 9.0% had someone living alone who was 65 years of age or older.  The average household size was 2.65 and the average family size was 3.06.

In the township the population was spread out, with 25.5% under the age of 18, 5.1% from 18 to 24, 24.1% from 25 to 44, 27.2% from 45 to 64, and 18.0% who were 65 years of age or older.  The median age was 42 years. For every 100 females there were 110.0 males.  For every 100 females age 18 and over, there were 119.0 males.

The median income for a household in the township was $27,917, and the median income for a family was $33,000. Males had a median income of $30,114 versus $15,625 for females. The per capita income for the township was $13,923.  About 7.3% of families and 13.1% of the population were below the poverty line, including 19.1% of those under the age of 18 and 9.8% of those 65 or over.

References

Townships in Jefferson County, Pennsylvania